Cartoons, also known as Cartoons DK, are a Eurodance band from Denmark, best known for their song "DooDah!" and their cover of the 1958 novelty song "Witch Doctor", both hits released in 1998. The band wears outlandish plastic costumes and wigs in live performances as caricatures of 1950s American rock and roll stars. 

Cartoons were originally called the Scooters in the late 1980s, and played rockabilly music from the 1950s and 1960s. In 1994, the Scooters released the album Live at Woodstock, and in 1997, the group changed its name to Cartoons.

Members
Toonie - lead and backing vocals. 
Sponge - bass, vocals, saxophone and keyboards. 
Shooter - lead guitar and backing vocals. 
Buzz - double bass. 
Puddy - backing vocals. 
Boop - backing vocals.

History
They were first signed to FLEX Records, moving later to EMI Denmark. 

Their most notable single to date is "Witch Doctor", which reached number two in the UK Singles Chart; with its combination of the original's "oo-ee-oo-aah-aah" chorus (although lacking that record's double-speed playback of the chorus), driving dance beat and occasional guitar breaks.

They had further success in the UK with the Top 10 hit, "DooDah!" (a version of the American folk song "Camptown Races"); the Top 20 hit "Aisy Waisy", which was performed on Jim Davidson's Generation Game; and a Top 20 debut album, Toonage (later released with additional songs under the title More Toonage). Along with there other hits with "Yoko", "Let's go childish", and "Ramalama Daisy"

Their second album Toontastic! did not match the success of its predecessor but several notable hits were released from it including "Diddley-Dee", "Little Red Riding Hood", "Chirpy Chirpy Cheep Cheep", "Big Coconuts" and a reworked cover of Les Humphries Singers' "Mama Loo."

Cartoons rounded out their success with a greatest hits album composed of previous tracks from their two albums as well as three new tracks.

In July 2016, Karina Jensen died from cancer, after having a double mastectomy in 2012.  She was survived by her husband and two children. In April 2019, Erling Jensen died of lymphoma. He was 50 years old. 

In 2018, Cartoons performed at the "We Love The 90's festival in Aalborg, Denmark. The band are currently active on their social media platforms such as Instagram and TikTok and are currently working on their fourth album.

In February 2023 the cartoons released there new song "shots"

Discography

Albums

Studio albums

Compilation albums

Singles

Main artist

Featured artist

References

External links
Profile of The Cartoons at eurodanceusa.com
Cartoons at Bubblegum Dancer

Danish pop music groups
Danish Eurodance groups
Musical groups established in 1996
Musical groups disestablished in 2006
English-language singers from Denmark
Bands with fictional stage personas
1996 establishments in Denmark
2006 disestablishments in Denmark